Helluocolpodes is a genus of beetles in the family Carabidae, containing the following species:

 Helluocolpodes discicollis Liebherr, 2005
 Helluocolpodes helluo Darlington, 1952
 Helluocolpodes mucronis Liebherr, 2005
 Helluocolpodes multipunctatus Liebherr, 2005
 Helluocolpodes sinister Liebherr, 2005
 Helluocolpodes vanemdeni Liebherr, 2005

References

Platyninae